ESF may refer to:

Education
 Écoles Sans Frontières, a French educational charity
 Education Without Borders (Spanish organization), a Spanish educational charity
 Emmanuel Schools Foundation, a British educational charity
 English Schools Foundation, an organization of twenty two Hong Kong schools
 Esperantic Studies Foundation, a Canadian Esperanto organization
 European School, Frankfurt am Main, in Germany
 Evans Scholars Foundation, an American scholarship program
 State University of New York College of Environmental Science and Forestry, in Syracuse, New York, United States

Science and technology
 European Science Foundation, a research organization
 European Studbook Foundation, studbooks of reptiles and amphibians in captivity
 Electro sinter forging
 Extended superframe
 Exatron Stringy Floppy, an 8-bit computer peripheral
 Explosion Suppressant Foam, used to protect from fire in aircraft wings

Other uses
 East Sea Fleet, of the Chinese People's Liberation Army Navy
 Empowering Spirits Foundation, an American LGBT rights organization
 English Stone Forum, a British conservation organization
 Entertainment Sports and Fun Camps (ESF), network of day camps
 Esler Airfield, in Louisiana, United States
 Estafeta Carga Aérea, a Mexican airline
 European Services Forum, a lobby group
 European Social Forum, a conference series
 European Social Fund of the European Union, currently European Social Fund Plus
 European Softball Federation
European Ski Federation
 European Squash Federation
 Exchange Stabilization Fund, of the United States Treasury Department
 Expeditionary strike group in the United States Navy